A chartered professional is a person who has gained a specific level of skill or competence in a particular field of work, which has been recognised by the award of a formal credential by a relevant professional organization. Common in Britain, it is also used in Ireland, the United States and the Commonwealth, and has been adopted by organizations around the world.

Chartered status originates from royal charters issued to professional bodies in the UK by the British Monarch, although such is the prestige and credibility of a chartered designation that some non-UK organisations have taken to issuing chartered designations without Royal or Parliamentary approval. In the UK, chartered titles may still only be awarded by institutions that have been incorporated under royal charter, with the permission of the Privy Council. The standards for chartered titles in the UK are set between the professional bodies and relevant government departments, and cannot be changed without government permission. Many chartered statuses in the UK and Ireland are also regulated professional titles under European professional qualification directives.

Standing and usage

Chartered status is generally considered a terminal qualification in a particular profession, in some fields professional bodies also offer lower level qualifications, such as Incorporated Engineer (IEng), Engineering Technician (EngTech) or Registered Scientist (RSci). It should not be confused on this point with the senior membership grade of Fellow in many professional institutes and learned societies, which is usually a measure of achievement and/or standing in a profession rather than a professional qualification based on assessment of competencies.

Chartered status is a form of accreditation, with there being a grant of a protected title but no requirement to be chartered in order to practice a profession (making it distinct from licensing). In the UK and other countries that follow its model, the professional bodies overseeing chartered statuses have a duty to act in the public interest, rather than in the interests of their members, ensuring that chartered professionals must meet ethical standards of behaviour. As a status, rather than simply a qualification, a chartered title may be removed for failure to adhere to codes of conduct, or lost through non-renewal. Someone who has lost the status may no longer describe themselves as chartered.

Many chartered statuses require initial academic preparation, normally to bachelor's level but sometimes to master's level (or equivalent experience) in engineering and scientific fields where an integrated master's degree is the standard first degree. After completion of academic training, it is normal to have to complete Initial Professional Development (IPD), which may include professional courses and examinations, to gain the competencies necessary for chartered status. Many chartered statuses also have a requirement that holders undertake Continuing Professional Development (CPD) to maintain and update their competencies, with some requiring evidence of CPD at regular intervals to renew the status. In the UK, the Privy Council has stated that its policy is "that the criteria for individual Chartered Status should be broadly similar across the professions". They also caution that chartered designations used without approval by the Queen in Council or the Privy Council "are not recognised by the UK Government and no assurance can be given that such designations meet the same high standards as authorised designations".

The full title used differs from profession to profession and is normally of the form "Chartered <profession name>", where <profession name> is replaced by the name of the profession (e.g. Engineer or Accountant), sometimes with qualifiers to differentiate it from a similar title issued by another body (e.g. Marine Engineer or Management Accountant).

In the UK, chartered professional titles may only be trademarked if issued by a body holding a royal charter and which has permission under its charter to grant that title. Chartered professional titles are normally only permitted to be registered as collective trade marks. Guidance provided by the United Kingdom Intellectual Property Office is that the use of the word "chartered" in a trademark by a non-chartered organisation "would mislead the public into believing that the association and its members have chartered status."

In the US, "chartered" is considered a descriptive term, thus trademarks using "chartered" along with a descriptive title for the profession may only be registered on the principal register if they can be demonstrated to have acquired distinctiveness through exclusive usage in trade for at least five years. Alternatively, they may be registered on the supplemental register.

International use

The two best known chartered statuses are probably Chartered Engineer and Chartered Accountant, along with their derivatives. Examples of their use outside of the UK include Chartered Engineer (CEng) in Ireland (granted in 1969 by the Oireachtas), India and Singapore; Chartered Professional Engineer (CPEng) in Australia and
New Zealand (under the Chartered Professional Engineers of New Zealand Act 2002); ASEAN Chartered Professional Engineer (ACPE) in participating ASEAN member states by the ASEAN Chartered Professional Engineer Coordinating Committee; Chartered Accountant in Australia, India, Ireland, New Zealand, Pakistan, Singapore, South Africa and Zambia; and Chartered Professional Accountant in Canada. Chartered Engineer (or a derivative) is also used in the official translation of titles from Austria, Croatia, the Czech Republic, Iceland and Slovakia, while Chartered Accountant (or a derivative) is used in the official translation of titles from Austria, France, Hungary, Iceland, and Romania.

In the US Chartered qualifications are offered by private education providers such as The American College of Financial Services and the Global Academy of Finance & Management (formerly the American Academy of Financial Management). Unlike chartered qualifications in most countries, these are not issued under a royal/government charter or legislation. The UK Intellectual Property Office refused a trademark application for the US Chartered Financial Analyst qualification on the grounds that it was not granted by a body with a royal charter and therefore had the potential to be deceptive.

Historical development

While the concept of royal charters dates back to the eleventh century, the idea of someone being a chartered professional only dates to the 19th century. The first chartered professionals were accountants in Scotland. The Society of Accountants in Edinburgh (now part of the Institute of Chartered Accountants of Scotland) was founded in 1853 and the title Chartered Accountant was in use by 1855. The title spread to England and Wales with the granting of a charter to the Institute of Chartered Accountants in England and Wales in 1880 and to Ireland with the chartering of the Institute of Chartered Accountants in Ireland in 1888.

The next professionals to adopt the title were Chartered Surveyors in 1903 and Chartered Directors in 1906. These were followed between the wars by Chartered Civil Engineers (1923), Chartered Electrical Engineers (1924), Chartered Architects (1924) Chartered Textile Technologists (1925) and Chartered Mechanical Engineers (1930). Coverage of the grant to the Institution of Civil Engineers made it clear that the title Chartered Civil Engineer was intended to act as a form of occupational closure:

In the Commonwealth, the title Chartered Accountant was adopted by Acts of Parliament in Canada in 1902 and in South Africa in 1927. It spread to Australia in 1928 with the granting of a royal charter to the Institute of Chartered Accountants in Australia (now part of Chartered Accountants Australia and New Zealand). The Institute of Chartered Accountants of India was established by Act of Parliament in 1949 and the Institute of Chartered Accountants of Pakistan by Act of Parliament in 1961.

Development in the US began in 1927 with the establishment of the American College of Life Underwriters (now The American College of Financial Services) offering the Chartered Life Underwriter designation. This marked not only the first use of a chartered title in the US but also the first use without government permission by either Charter or Act of Parliament. This was a sharp contrast to the situation in the Commonwealth, where accountants in South Africa and Australia had been engaged in a decades-long struggle to gain the right to use a chartered title that came to fruition at about the same time. The CLU was followed, after many years of preparatory work, by the incorporation of the Institute of Chartered Financial Analysts (now the CFA Institute) in 1962 and the creation of the Chartered Financial Analyst designation in 1963.

With the Engineering profession in the UK fractured into many different professional institutions, the 13 chartered engineering institutions formed the Engineering Institutes Joint Council in 1962, which was chartered as the Council of Engineering Institutions in 1965 and introduced the title of Chartered Engineer with the designatory letters CEng. This marked the introduction of separate post-nominals for chartered status, which had previously been (and still is in many institutions) marked by the same post-nominals as membership. The CEng spread to Ireland a few years later in 1969. Following the introduction of the CEng, many scientific professional bodies also gained the right to award chartered status, such as Chartered Chemist (1975), Chartered Biologist (1979), Chartered Physicist (1985) and Chartered Geologist (1990). This expansion was driven less by occupational closure than a desire to demonstrate professional equality with the engineers.

When the European Communities (Recognition of Professional Qualifications) Regulations were introduced in the UK in 1991, they featured 40 chartered statuses, including five forms of Chartered Surveyor from the Royal Institution of Chartered Surveyors, Chartered Accountants from three different bodies, and two titles from the Chartered Insurance Institute. The most recent version of the regulations, from 2015, lists 71 chartered statuses, now including 20 varieties of Chartered Surveyor. The UK Privy Council list includes (as of November 2018) 107 titles, including 20 variants on Chartered Surveyor, and is noted as not being exhaustive.

The 21st century has seen moves to increase professionalism. The Chartered Physicist status, for example, has, since 2001, required a master's degree to fulfill the academic preparation and is no longer awarded automatically to all corporate members of the Institute of Physics, and since 2012 has required evidence of CPD to be presented to renew the status every 3 years. Similarly Chartered Engineers in the UK have needed a master's degree since 2012, and in Ireland since 2013. The Chartered Scientist title, introduced in 2004, required a master's degree and annual re-validation through evidence of CPD from the start.

Titles
Not an exhaustive list:
ASEAN Chartered Professional Engineer (ACPE)
Chartered Accountant (CA/ACA/FCA)
Chartered Administrator (C.Adm. (Canada)/ACIA (Nigeria))
Chartered Advisor in Philanthropy (CAP)
Chartered Advisor for Senior Living (CASL)
Chartered Alternative Investment Analyst (CAIA)
Chartered Appraiser/Chartered Assessor
Chartered Arbitrator (FCIArb)
Chartered Arboriculturist/Chartered Forester (MICFor)
Chartered Architect (RIBA/RIAS/FRIAS)
Chartered Architectural Technologist (MCIAT)
Chartered Asset Manager (CAM)
Chartered Banker (MCIBS)
Chartered Biologist (CBiol)
Chartered Builder (MCIOB/FCIOB)
Chartered Building Engineer (CBuildE)
Chartered Building Professional (MAIB/FAIB/LFAIB)
Chartered Building Services Engineer (MCIBSE)
Chartered Business Consultant
Chartered Business Professional
Chartered Business Valuator (CBV)
Chartered CEO Professional
Chartered Certified Accountant (ACCA/FCCA)
Chartered Certified Municipal Finance Management Practitioner (CCMFMP)
Chartered Certified Public Finance Management Accountant (CCFMA)
Chartered Certified Insurance Professional (CCIP)
Chartered Certified International Banker (CCIB)
Chartered Chemical Engineer (MIChemE)
Chartered Chemist (CChem)
Chartered Civil Engineer (MICE)
Chartered Colourist (CCol)
Chartered Construction Manager (MCIOB/FCIOB)
Chartered Contract Management Professional (CCMP)
Chartered Cost Controller (CCC)
Chartered Customer Service Professional (CCSP)
Chartered Designer (MCSD)
Chartered Development Finance Analyst (CDFA)
Chartered Director (CDir)
Chartered Distribution Manager Specialist (CDMS)
Chartered Economist (ChE)
Chartered Educational Assessor (CEA)
Chartered Electrical Engineer (MIET/FIET)
Chartered Energy Engineer/Chartered Petroleum Engineer (MEI/FEI)
Chartered Engineer (CEng)
Chartered Enterprise Risk Analyst
Chartered Environmental Health Officer (Ch EHO)
Chartered Environmental Health Practitioner (CEnvH)
Chartered Environmentalist (CEnv)
Chartered Ergonomist and Human Factors Specialist (CErgHF)
Chartered Federal Employee Benefits Consultant
Chartered Finance Professional
Chartered Financial Analyst (CFA)
Chartered Financial Consultant
Chartered Financial Planner (AFPS)
Chartered Fellow/Member/Associate of the Institute of Financial Services (CFifs/CMifs/CAifs)
Chartered Financial Consultant (ChFC)
Chartered Gas Engineer (MIGEM)
Chartered Geographer (CGeog)
Chartered Geologist (CGeol)
Chartered Governance Professional (FCG/FCIS/ACG/ACIS), one of the two designations awarded by the Chartered Governance Institute.
Chartered Health Care Consultant (ChHC)
Chartered Horticulturist (CHort)
Chartered Humanitarian (CHum)
Chartered Insurer/Chartered Insurance Practitioner/Chartered Insurance Broker (ACII)
Chartered Insurance Professional
Chartered IT Professional (CITP)
Chartered Investment Management Professional (CIMP)
Chartered Investment Manager (CIM)
Chartered Professional in Islamic Finance (CPIF)
Chartered Landscape Architect (FLI/CMLI)
Chartered Legal Executive/Chartered Legal Executive Advocate (FCILEx)
Chartered Fellow/Member of the Chartered Institute of Library and Information Professionals (FCLIP/MCLIP)
Chartered Leadership Fellow (CLF)
Chartered Life Underwriter (CLU)
Chartered Linguist (CL)
Chartered Fellow/Member of the Chartered Institute of Logistics and Transport (FCILT/CMILT)
Chartered London Teacher (CLT)
Chartered Loss Adjuster (CLA)
Chartered Management Accountant (ACMA/FCMA)
Chartered Management Consultant (ChMC)
Chartered Management Professional
Chartered Member/Fellow of the Chartered Institute for the Management of Sport and Physical Activity (FCIMSPA (chartered)/MCIMSPA (chartered))
Chartered Member of the Institute of Internal Auditors (CMIIA)
Chartered Manager (CMgr)
Chartered Marine Engineer (CMarEng)
Chartered Market Analyst (CMA)
Chartered Market Technician (CMT)
Chartered Marketer (CMktr)
Chartered Mathematician (CMath)
Chartered Mathematics Teacher (CMathTeach)
Chartered Mechanical Engineer (MIMechE/FIMechE)
Chartered Materials Manager Professional (CMMP)
Chartered Measurement and Control Technologist (MInstMC)
Chartered Meteorologist (CMet)
Chartered Mortgage Analyst (ChMA)
Chartered Mutual Fund Counselor (CMFC)
Chartered Occupational Hygienist (CMFOH/CFFOH)
Chartered Patent Attorney (CPA)
Chartered Pension Analyst Manager (CPAM)
Chartered Pension Manager (CPM)
Chartered Fellow/Member of the Chartered Institute of Personnel and Development (FCIPD/MCIPD)
Chartered Physicist (CPhys)
Chartered Physiotherapist (MCSP (UK)/MISCP (Ireland))
Chartered Portfolio Manager (CPR)
Chartered Procurement and Supply Professional (MCIPS – Chartered Procurement and Supply Professional/FCIPS – Chartered Procurement and Supply Professional)
Chartered Procurement Risk Manager 
Chartered Procurement Specialist Professional (CPSP)
Chartered Production Planning Professional (CPPP)
Chartered Professional Accountant (CPA)
Chartered Professional Engineer (CPEng)
Chartered Project Management Professional (CPMP)
Chartered Project Management Specialist (CPMS)
Chartered Project Procurement Manager (CPPM)
Chartered Project Professional (ChPP)
Chartered Property Casualty Underwriter (CPCU)
Chartered Psychologist (CPsychol)
Chartered Public Finance Accountant (CIPFA)
Chartered Public Relations Practitioner (Chart.PR)
Chartered Quality Professional (CQP)
Chartered Radiation Protection Professional (CRadP)
Chartered Real Estate Consultant
Chartered Realty Investor
Chartered Relationship Management Specialist
Chartered Safety and Health Practitioner (CMIOSH/CFIOSH)
Chartered Sales Professional
Chartered Scientist (CSci)
Chartered Science Teacher (CSciTeach)
Chartered Secretary (FCG/FCIS/ACG/ACIS), one of the two designations awarded by the Chartered Governance Institute
Chartered Fellow/Member of the Chartered Institute for Securities and Investment (Chartered FCISI/Chartered MCISI)
Chartered Security Manager (CSM)
Chartered Security Professional (CSyP)
Chartered Senior Financial Planned
Chartered Shipbroker (MICS)
Chartered Special Needs Consultant
Chartered Statistician (CStat)
Chartered Strategic Management Professional
Chartered Strategic Sourcing Professional (CSSP)
Chartered Structural Engineer (AIStructE/MIStructE/FIStructE)
Chartered Supply Chain Professional™  (Level 3 -ACSCP™ (Affiliate Level), Level 4-CSCPP™ (Practitioner level),Level-5-CSCPE™(Expert level), Level-6-CSCPS™(Specialist level), Level-7-MCSCP™ (Master level), Level-8-FCSCP™ (Fellow )
Chartered Supply Chain Management Professional (CSCMP)
Chartered Supply Management Professional (CSMP)
Chartered Surveyor (MRICS or FRICS)
Also Chartered Arts and Antiques Surveyor; Chartered Building Surveyor; Chartered Building Control Surveyor; Chartered Civil Engineering Surveyor; Chartered Commercial Property Surveyor; Chartered Construction Surveyor; Chartered Engineering Surveyor; Chartered Environmental Surveyor; Chartered Facilities Management Surveyor; Chartered Forestry Surveyor; Chartered Hydrographic Surveyor; Chartered Land Surveyor; Chartered Machinery Valuation Surveyor; Chartered Management Consultancy Surveyor; Chartered Minerals Surveyor; Chartered Planning and Development Surveyor; Chartered Project Management Surveyor; Chartered Quantity Surveyor; Chartered Valuation Surveyor.
Chartered Tax Adviser (CTA)
Chartered Teacher of English (CTE)
Chartered Textile Technologist (CText)
Chartered Town Planner (MRTPI)
Chartered Transport and Logistics Professional (CTLP)
Chartered Transport Planning Professional (CTPP)
Chartered Trust and Estate Planner (CTEP)
Chartered Warehouse Management Professional (CWMP)
Chartered Waste Manager (MCIWM)
Chartered Water and Environment Manager (C.WEM)
Chartered Wealth Advisor
Chartered Wealth Manager (CWM (US)/Chartered FCISI/Chartered MCISI (UK))

Notes

References

Professional titles and certifications
Professionals